The St. Lucie Canal, also known as the C-44 Canal or simply C-44, is a man-made canal in Martin County, Florida, connecting Lake Okeechobee to the Indian River Lagoon. The canal was built between 1916 and 1924 to divert floodwaters from the lake into the St. Lucie Estuary via the South Fork of the St. Lucie River. Deepened in 1937 to enable the passage of boats, the St. Lucie Canal is now the eastern segment of the Okeechobee Waterway.

The C-44 has been a source of contention since its construction. The canal has had significant environmental impacts—restoration projects in the St. Lucie River are the northernmost component of the Comprehensive Everglades Restoration Plan.

Description

The St. Lucie Canal connects to Lake Okeechobee at Port Mayaca, Florida. In 1933, 16 fixed spillways were approved for construction to reduce shoaling.

Water flow

In 1937, the canal was deepened to  increasing its flow capacity.

According to the Florida Department of Environmental Protection, the St. Lucie Canal flows both east to the St. Lucie Estuary and west to Lake Okeechobee "on about an equal basis."

Navigation

The St. Lucie Canal connects to the Caloosahatchee Waterway, which connects Lake Okeechobee to the Gulf of Mexico at Fort Myers, Florida.

Locks and structures

There are two locks on the St. Lucie Canal. The Port Mayaca Lock and Dam (also known as S-308) is located at the western end of the canal at its outlet to Lake Okeechobee. Its rise is typically .

A structure known as S-153 regulates water flow from the Levee 65 Borrow Canal into the St. Lucie Canal.

Environmental and navigation problems

Fresh water discharge
One of the major problems resulting from the construction of C-44 is that control of the water levels of Lake Okeechobee causes too much fresh water to discharge from the canal into the St. Lucie Estuary. Large discharges from Lake Okeechobee into C-44 cause salinity levels to drop rapidly, killing many species in the estuary.

Turbidity
High flow rates in the canal result in erosion and the transport of sediment into the St. Lucie Estuary that can smother benthic habitats. The increased turbidity of high flow rates also results in sediment filling navigation channels.

Drainage basin
Drainage from the canal′s drainage basin into the St. Lucie Canal creates water quality problems in the St. Lucie Estuary.

History
Construction of the C-44 Canal began in 1916 and was completed in 1924. The original purpose of the canal was to allow for an improved way to divert floodwaters from Lake Okeechobee. The canal was originally designed to flow into Manatee Pocket instead of the South Fork of the St. Lucie River.

The C-44 has been a source of contention since its construction in 1916. Records indicate that people have been complaining about the negative impacts of the canal since the early 1950s.

Timeline

 1916: Construction begins on canal C-44.

References

Canals in Florida
1916 establishments in Florida